Monder Rizki (born 16 August 1979) is a Belgian long-distance runner. He was born in Brussels.

At the 2006 European Athletics Championships Rizki finished eleventh in the 5000 metres and seventeenth in the 10,000 metres.

Personal bests
3000 metres - 7:42.84 min (2004)
5000 metres - 13:04.06 min (2008)
10,000 metres - 28:07.10 min (2006)

Personal Best Indoor

1500 metres	3:42.83		Gent	22/02/2004
3000 metres	7:53.67		Stuttgart	04/02/2006
Two miles 8:27.23		Birmingham	18/02/2005

Progression - Outdoor
3000 Metres

2012       8:01.39	        Karlstad GP 19/06/2012
2008	7:43.73		Monaco	29/07/2008
2007	7:46.94		Oordegem	07/07/2007
2005	8:11.70		Leiria	19/06/2005
2004	7:42.84		Rehlingen	31/05/2004
2003	7:49.26		Oordegem	16/08/2003

5000 Metres	

2013	13.37.52          Finland     15/06/2013
2012	13:35.33		Tunis	16/06/2012  
2012       13:41.62          Sollentuna 05/06/2012   
2010	13:31.60		Huelva	09/06/2010
2008	13:04.06		Heusden-Zolder	20/07/2008
2006	13:27.46		Heusden-Zolder	22/07/2006
2005	13:25.66		Rovereto 31/08/2005
2004	13:15.51		Heusden-Zolder	31/07/2004
2003	13:38.57		Arnhem	25/06/2003

10,000 Metres	

2009	28:38.27		Ribeira Brava (Madeira06/06/2009
2006	28:07.10		Neerpelt	05/06/2006

half marathon

2012     67'16" Rouen Fr.
2009     61'47" Austine USA
2007     64'16" Dallas TX/USA	

 Road Race 5 km

2013    14:03.8      San Jose 28/11/2013

 Road Race 30 km

2012    1:42:25       Lidingöloppet cross Stockholm SWE 26/09/2012

Honours

1500 Metres

10th IAAF World Indoor Championships		9	h	3:49.88		Budapest (SA)	06/03/2004
 European Cup 1st League   3   f     3:44.89   Lappeenranta (Fin) 22/06/2003

3000 Metres

European Cup First League Group B		3	f	8:11.70		Leiria (Por)	19/06/2005

5000 Metres

28e Coupe d'Europe des nations d'athlétisme  1  f   14:15.46  Munich (olympic stadium)  23/06/2007 
The XXIX Olympic Games		8	h	13:54.41		Beijing (National Stadium)	20/08/2008
19th European Athletics Championships		11	f	14:04.96		Göteborg	13/08/2006
28th Olympic Games		16	h	14:03.58		Athína (Olympic Stadium)	25/08/2004

10,000 Metres

13th European Cup 10,000m		7	f	28:38.27		Ribeira Brava (Madeira)	06/06/2009
19th European Athletics Championships		17	f	29:13.62		Göteborg	08/08/2006

Short Race

31st IAAF World Cross Country Championships		112	f	12:42		Lausanne	29/03/2003

External links

1979 births
Living people
Belgian male long-distance runners
Athletes (track and field) at the 2004 Summer Olympics
Athletes (track and field) at the 2008 Summer Olympics
Olympic athletes of Belgium
Sportspeople from Brussels